Es Figueral is a small resort village and beach on the northeastern coast of Ibiza, near the Illa de Tagomago.  
The village, is part of the city of Santa Eularia des Riu.

References

Populated places in Ibiza
Beaches of Ibiza
Beaches of the Balearic Islands